José de Matos (born 14 April 1932) is a Portuguese former sports shooter. He competed in the skeet event at the 1972 Summer Olympics.

References

1932 births
Living people
Portuguese male sport shooters
Olympic shooters of Portugal
Shooters at the 1972 Summer Olympics
Place of birth missing (living people)